The Davitt Awards are literary awards which are presented annually by the Sisters in Crime Australia association. The awards are named in honour of Ellen Davitt (1812–1879) who wrote Australia's first mystery novel, Force and Fraud in 1865.  They are presented for Australian crime fiction, by women, for both adults and young adults. They were established in 2001 to mark the 10th anniversary of the association.

Categories
Adult Novel
Young Adult Novel
True Crime
Debut Crime
Readers' Choice

Previous winners

2000s

2010s

See also

 List of Australian literary awards
 List of literary awards honoring women
 Sisters in Crime

References

External links
Davitt Awards

Australian literary awards
Literary awards honoring women
Mystery and detective fiction awards
Awards established in 2001